Mandy Minella was the defending champion, however she chose not to participate due to a right arm edema.

Edina Gallovits-Hall won the title, defeating Petra Martić in the final, 6–2, 6–2.

Seeds

Main draw

Finals

Top half

Bottom half

References 
 Main draw

South Seas Island Resort Women's Pro Classic - Singles